Kurt Krömer (stage name for Alexander Bojcan) (born 20 November 1974) is a German television presenter, comedian and actor.

Life 
Krömer was born in Berlin. He works as actor and comedian in German television and film. From 2003 to 2005 the rbb broadcast the Kurt Krömer Show, which attracted nationwide attention and succeeded the format Bei Krömers for German broadcaster ARD. Krömer has three sons.

Filmography 
 2006: Wo ist Fred?
 2007: 
 2009: Familie Sonnenfeld,  Abschied von Oma
 2009: Ein starkes Team, episode Geschlechterkrieg
 2010: Polen für Anfänger (road movie), director: Katrin Rothe; together with Steffen Möller
 2010: , director Dani Levy
 2010: 
 2011: Eine Insel namens Udo

Awards 
 2005
 German Comedy Award – Best newcomer
 2006
 Deutscher Fernsehpreis – Best comedy for Bei Krömers
 Zeck-Kabarettpreis – newcomer award Fresh-Zeck
 2007
 Deutscher Kleinkunstpreis in category Kleinkunst
 Das große Kleinkunstfestival – Berlin-Preis
 2009
 1Live Krone – best comedy
 2011
 Grimme Award – best entertainment
 2020
 Grimme-Preis

External links

References 

1974 births
Living people
German male television actors
German male film actors
German male comedians
German television presenters
Male actors from Berlin
ARD (broadcaster) people
Rundfunk Berlin-Brandenburg people
Comedians from Berlin
German television talk show hosts